Carcelia is a genus of flies in the family Tachinidae.

Species
Subgenus Carcelia Robineau-Desvoidy, 1830
Carcelia albifacies Townsend, 1927
Carcelia alpestris Herting, 1966
Carcelia amplexa (Coquillett, 1897)
Carcelia angustipalpis Chao & Liang, 2002
Carcelia atricosta Herting, 1961
Carcelia auripulvis Chao & Liang, 2002
Carcelia bombylans Robineau-Desvoidy, 1830
Carcelia brevipilosa Chao & Liang, 1986
Carcelia candidae Shima, 1981
Carcelia canutipulvera Chao & Liang, 1986
Carcelia caudata Baranov, 1931
Carcelia caudatella Baranov, 1932
Carcelia diacrisiae Sellers, 1943
Carcelia dubia (Brauer & von Bergenstamm, 1891)
Carcelia falx Chao & Liang, 1986
Carcelia flavimaculata Sun & Chao, 1992
Carcelia formosa (Aldrich & Webber, 1924)
Carcelia gnava (Meigen, 1824)
Carcelia hamata Chao & Liang, 1986
Carcelia hardyi (Curran, 1938)
Carcelia iliaca (Ratzeburg, 1840)
Carcelia illiberisi Chao & Liang, 2002
Carcelia inculta (Wiedemann, 1830)
Carcelia inflatipalpis (Aldrich & Webber, 1924)
Carcelia iridipennis (Wulp, 1893)
Carcelia kowarzi Villeneuve, 1912
Carcelia lagoae (Townsend, 1891)
Carcelia languida (Walker, 1858)
Carcelia laxifrons Villeneuve, 1912
Carcelia longichaeta Chao & Shi, 1982
Carcelia lucorum (Meigen, 1824)
Carcelia malayana Baranov, 1934
Carcelia matsukarehae (Shima, 1969)
Carcelia nigrantennata Chao & Liang, 1986
Carcelia noumeensis Mesnil, 1968
Carcelia nudioculata Villeneuve, 1938
Carcelia olenensis Sellers, 1943
Carcelia perplexa Sellers, 1943
Carcelia piligena Mesnil, 1953
Carcelia protuberans (Aldrich & Webber, 1924)
Carcelia pseudocaudata (Baranov, 1934)
Carcelia puberula Mesnil, 1941
Carcelia rasa (Macquart, 1850)
Carcelia rasella Baranov, 1931
Carcelia rasoides Baranov, 1931
Carcelia reclinata (Aldrich & Webber, 1924)
Carcelia rutilloides Baranov, 1931
Carcelia setosella Baranov, 1931
Carcelia sexta Baranov, 1931
Carcelia sumatrana Townsend, 1927
Carcelia sumatrensis (Townsend, 1927)
Carcelia tasmanica Robineau-Desvoidy, 1863
Carcelia tenuiforceps (Reinhard, 1964)
Carcelia thalpocharidis Herting, 1959
Carcelia tjibodana Townsend, 1927
Carcelia townsendi Crosskey, 1976
Carcelia venusa (Curran, 1928)
Carcelia vibrissata Chao & Zhou, 1992
Carcelia vicinalis Cantrell, 1985
Carcelia yalensis Sellers, 1943
Carcelia yongshunensis Sun & Chao, 1992
Subgenus Carcelita Mesnil, 1975
Carcelia abrelicta Mesnil, 1950
Carcelia aequalis Villeneuve, 1939
Carcelia angulicornis Villeneuve, 1916
Carcelia argyriceps (Curran, 1927)
Carcelia atricans Mesnil, 1955
Carcelia bigoti (Jaennicke, 1867)
Carcelia forcipata Mesnil, 1977
Carcelia inusta Mesnil, 1950
Carcelia keiseri Mesnil, 1977
Carcelia lindneri Mesnil, 1959
Carcelia lucidula Villeneuve, 1941
Carcelia normula (Curran, 1927)
Carcelia oculata (Villeneuve, 1910)
Carcelia orbitalis (Curran, 1927)
Carcelia patellata Mesnil, 1977
Carcelia pellex Mesnil, 1950
Carcelia persimilis Mesnil, 1950
Carcelia vaga (Curran, 1927)
Carcelia vara (Curran, 1927)
Carcelia vexor (Curran, 1927)
Subgenus Cargilla Richter, 1980
Carcelia transbaicalica Richter, 1980
Subgenus Catacarcelia Townsend, 1927
Carcelia burnsi Cantrell, 1985
Carcelia kockiana (Townsend, 1927)
Carcelia talwurrapin Cantrell, 1985
Subgenus Euryclea Robineau-Desvoidy, 1863
Carcelia ceylanica (Brauer & von Bergenstamm, 1891)
Carcelia clava Chao & Liang, 1986
Carcelia delicatula Mesnil, 1968
Carcelia falenaria (Rondani, 1859)
Carcelia flava Chao & Liang, 1986
Carcelia flavitibia Cantrell, 1985
Carcelia hemimacquartioides (Baranov, 1934)
Carcelia latistylata (Baranov, 1934)
Carcelia longimana (Mesnil, 1953)
Carcelia pallensa Chao & Liang, 2002
Carcelia setifrons Mesnil, 1949
Carcelia tibialis (Robineau-Desvoidy, 1863)
Carcelia villicauda Chao & Liang, 1986
Carcelia xanthohirta Chao & Liang, 1986
Subgenus Myxocarcelia Baranov, 1934
Carcelia aberrans Baranov, 1931
Carcelia europea Richter, 1977
Carcelia excisoides (Mesnil, 1957)
Carcelia hirsuta Baranov, 1931
Carcelia pilosella Baranov, 1931
Carcelia shibuyai (Shima, 1968)
Carcelia takanoi (Mesnil, 1957)
Carcelia yakushimana (Shima, 1968)
Unplaced to subgenus
Carcelia adjuncta (Wulp, 1890)
Carcelia argenticeps (Wulp, 1890)
Carcelia badalingensis Chao & Liang, 2009
Carcelia brevis (Wulp, 1890)
Carcelia dilaticornis Mesnil, 1950
Carcelia ethillamima Cerretti, 2019
Carcelia flavirostris (Wulp, 1890)
Carcelia griseomicans (Wulp, 1890)
Carcelia halliana Cortés, 1945
Carcelia longicornis (Wulp, 1890)
Carcelia normula (Wulp, 1890)
Carcelia oblectanea Mesnil, 1950
Carcelia oblimata Mesnil, 1950
Carcelia obliterata Mesnil, 1950
Carcelia peraequalis Mesnil, 1950.
Carcelia pesitra Cantrell, 1985
Carcelia rubrella Robineau-Desvoidy, 1830
Carcelia stackelbergi (Mesnil, 1963)
Carcelia tentans (Walker, 1858)

References

Tachinidae genera
Exoristinae
Taxa named by Jean-Baptiste Robineau-Desvoidy
Diptera of South America
Diptera of North America
Diptera of Africa
Diptera of Europe
Diptera of Asia
Diptera of Australasia
Europe